Souvenirs from Earth (SFE) is an independent TV station broadcasting a 24/7 program of art films, music, installations, and performances. It is based in Germany and currently can be viewed via French, German, and Austrian cable as well as over the internet through the website's livestream and in certain public locations.

A catalog of over 3000 videos of art, experimental films, contemporary dance videos, avante garde music videos, and films of photographs are in constant motion within the channel earning it the nickname as "The MTV of Contemporary Art".

History 
Close to the ideas of Nam June Paik and Brian Eno, the concept for the channel was first presented at the Institute of Contemporary Arts in 1998 and at the Venice Biennale in 1999 by Marcus Kreiss. In 2006, SFE received the license to broadcast in Germany and the channel officially went on air that year. In 2008, the channel started airing in France via Iliad (company) and in 2014 the channel started broadcasting via Austrian cable through Kabel Austria and A One.

In 2009, SFE acquired a permanent installation at Palais de Tokyo and, in 2010, the channel became a residing fixture in all German airports. In 2011, the SFE was invited by the French Institute to present the channel at the Nam June Paik Center in Seoul, South Korea and while there put a show together to be viewed in Central Station on the largest LED screen in the world.

In 2007, the channel's staff added Alec Crichton, a curator from the Academy of Media Arts Cologne to manage the incoming submissions from international artists for the channel's broadcast. In 2012, Markus Kienast, a telco engineer, created the livestream and aided the station's programming software and international development while Wolfgang Kabisch, a cultural journalist, became the editor-in-chief of the channel's cultural output in 2013. In 2014, glamour girl Melissa Mourer Ordener joined the team as the official muse.

Programming 
SFE is an alternative approach to television and is referred to as "anti-television" or "the MTV of contemporary art". The content is submitted by artists around the world and then curated into constantly changing broadcasts. The channel has no broadcast schedule and is constantly bringing in new content, so each viewing experience is completely unique and unpredictable.

SFE programming is largely non-verbal due to the nature of video art and can be understood no matter what language the viewer speaks. SFE plans for this to appeal to a broader international audience and is the first international art channel thanks to the lack of a language barrier. The online livestream broadcasts the same content around the world so everyone is always watching the same content in real time.

The channel also gives universities the opportunity to have their own broadcast time so students can showcase their own work on the same platform as other renowned artists, such as Tom Sachs, James Turrell, Bill Viola, and Mike Kilo. In these cases, the broadcasts adopt the title "Souvenirs from  " (ex. Souvenirs from Mars is the name of the broadcast from The University of Marseille).

A large portion of the broadcast is allotted to externally curated programs, often provided by young, up and coming curators, or to Carte Blanche special formats for artists (Iris Brosch, Tom Sachs…) or institutions (Art Cologne, Centre Georges Pompidou.)

SFE expands the idea of television, giving it opportunities to be viewed both actively and passively as "video paintings" through the integration with public spaces.

Advertisements 
The channel refuses to have advertisements broadcast on the channel in order to maintain the integrity of the art space and viewing experience. Companies looking to have their name on the channel have the option of making an art video that can be seamlessly integrated in to the programs or the station can air an "anti-commercial" in which the station broadcasts a solid color field with the name of the company in it for 30 seconds.

Notable clients who have advertised using the channel include:
Apple Inc.
Aesop (cosmetics)
Spacehair
Louis Vuitton
Twins for Peace
Jeu de Paume
Centre Georges Pompidou
Art Cologne

Distribution 

SFE distributes its programming continusously:

 In France by Orange S.A. (channel 221), Free (channel 169), SFR (channel 183), and Bouygues (channel 217)
 In Germany by Unitymedia and Kabel BW
In Austria by Kabel Eins
 Via online streaming at souvenirsfromearth.tv

Public Spaces

Logo

The logo for SFE is inspired by In Search of Lost Time by Marcel Proust. In the book, there is a scene in which Proust recalls sitting in his garden and having a moment of total recall triggered by the taste of the madeleine (cake) he was soaking in his tea. Proust's writing focused on memories and the idea that our memory affects our perception of reality and SFE incorporated this iconic madeline to symbolize the artistic process in which we transform our reality. The basis of the channel is a collective memory of moments which are the created reality of the artist behind the screen. The graphic design of the madeline also recalls the icon for Star Trek and the futuristic concept of "video paintings" which were originally inspired by science fiction set designers.

See also
 List of video artists
 Experimental film
 New media art
 Interactive film
 Video jockey
 VJ (video performance artist)
 Music visualization
 Scratch Video
 Visual Music
 Real-time computer graphics
 Video poetry
 Video sculpture
 Artmedia

References

External links

 ARTE Coverage Video
 SFE on Orange Network
 SFE on GoGoParis

Direct broadcast satellite services